Phosphatidylinositol-4,5-bisphosphate 4-phosphatase (EC 3.1.3.78, phosphatidylinositol-4,5-bisphosphate 4-phosphatase I, phosphatidylinositol-4,5-bisphosphate 4-phosphatase II, type I PtdIns-4,5-P2 4-Ptase, type II PtdIns-4,5-P2 4-Ptase, IpgD, PtdIns-4,5-P2 4-phosphatase type I, PtdIns-4,5-P2 4-phosphatase type II, type I phosphatidylinositol-4,5-bisphosphate 4-phosphatase, type 1 4-phosphatase) is an enzyme with systematic name 1-phosphatidyl-1D-myo-inositol-4,5-bisphosphate 4-phosphohydrolase. This enzyme catalyses the following chemical reaction

 1-phosphatidyl-1D-myo-inositol 4,5-bisphosphate + H2O  1-phosphatidyl-1D-myo-inositol 5-phosphate + phosphate

This enzyme participates in one of the mammalian pathways for degradation of 1-phosphatidyl-1D-myo-inositol 4,5-bisphosphate [PtdIns(4,5)P2].

References

External links 
 

EC 3.1.3